Jan Hofmeyr may refer to:

 Jan Hendrik Hofmeyr (Onze Jan), (1845–1909), known as "Our Jan" (Onze Jan), journalist and South African politician, leader of the Afrikaner Bond political party of the Cape Colony
 Jan Hendrik Hofmeyr (1894–1948), Nephew of "Our Jan", Rhodes Scholar, university professor and South African politician 
 Jan-Hendrik S. Hofmeyr, South African biologist and complexity theorist
 Jan Hendrik Hofmeyr de Waal (1871–1937), (af:) Afrikaner, member of parliament